Daphnia nivalis is a species of water flea in the family Daphniidae, closely related to Daphnia carinata. It is endemic to the Snowy Mountains of eastern Australia, where it lives only in water bodies that have existed for less than 20,000 years, including Lake Cootapatamba, Australia's highest lake. Due to its restricted range, it is listed as a vulnerable species on the IUCN Red List.

References

Cladocera
Freshwater crustaceans of Australia
Vulnerable fauna of Australia
Taxonomy articles created by Polbot
Crustaceans described in 1977